This article lists the results for the Denmark women's national football team from their first official match against Sweden in 1974 to the present day.

Results
Note that scores are written Denmark first

Key

1970s

1980s

Notes

References

Sources
 Landsholdsdatabasen at DBU.dk

Denmark women's national football team
2020s in Danish sport